In Greek mythology, Iphinous (Ancient Greek: Ἰφίνοον) may refer to the following personages:

 Iphinous, one of the centaurs who fought against the Lapiths at Pirithous' wedding. He was slain with a sword by Peleus during the said battle.
 Iphinous, son of Dexius and an Achaean soldier who participated in the Trojan War. He was killed by Glaucus, son of Hippolochus, during the siege of Troy. The Lycian leader hurled a spear at Iphinous' shoulder as he sprung to the latter's chariot behind his horses causing him to fell from the car to the ground.
 Iphinous, defender of Thebes against the Seven Against Thebes. He was killed by the Argive seer, Amphiaraus.

See also 
  for Jovian asteroid 11395 Iphinous

Notes

References 

 Homer, The Iliad with an English Translation by A.T. Murray, Ph.D. in two volumes. Cambridge, MA., Harvard University Press; London, William Heinemann, Ltd. 1924. . Online version at the Perseus Digital Library.
 Homer, Homeri Opera in five volumes. Oxford, Oxford University Press. 1920. . Greek text available at the Perseus Digital Library.
 Publius Ovidius Naso, Metamorphoses translated by Brookes More (1859-1942). Boston, Cornhill Publishing Co. 1922. Online version at the Perseus Digital Library.
 Publius Ovidius Naso, Metamorphoses. Hugo Magnus. Gotha (Germany). Friedr. Andr. Perthes. 1892. Latin text available at the Perseus Digital Library.
 Publius Papinius Statius, The Thebaid translated by John Henry Mozley. Loeb Classical Library Volumes. Cambridge, MA, Harvard University Press; London, William Heinemann Ltd. 1928. Online version at the Topos Text Project.
 Publius Papinius Statius, The Thebaid. Vol I-II. John Henry Mozley. London: William Heinemann; New York: G.P. Putnam's Sons. 1928. Latin text available at the Perseus Digital Library.

Characters in Greek mythology